Thomas John Giuliano II (born February 9, 1969), known professionally as Tom Scharpling, is an American comedian, television writer, producer, music video director, voice actor, and radio host. He is best known for hosting the weekly Internet radio call-in comedy program The Best Show with Tom Scharpling (formerly The Best Show on WFMU), the voice of Greg Universe in the animated series Steven Universe and its sequel series Steven Universe Future, and for acting as a writer/executive producer for the TV show Monk.

Scharpling was also a writer on Tom Goes to the Mayor and Tim and Eric Awesome Show, Great Job! Beginning in 1999, he released six albums with comedy partner Jon Wurster under the moniker Scharpling & Wurster.

As a writer, Scharpling has had work published in GQ, New York Magazine, and Harp. Since 2010, Scharpling has directed music videos for The New Pornographers, Ted Leo, Titus Andronicus, Wild Flag, Aimee Mann, Real Estate, Frankie Cosmos, and The Ettes.

Early life
Scharpling was born in New Jersey. He grew up in Dunellen, New Jersey. He was a fan of Saturday Night Live and SCTV from a young age. He attended Middlesex High School, Middlesex Community College, and Trenton State College. He graduated with a degree in English. Scharpling worked at a sheet music shop called World of Music in Summit, New Jersey from 1979 through 1999.

He has cited his major comedy influences as Chris Elliott's Get a Life, SCTV, Saturday Night Live, and the 1994 absurdist comedy Clifford starring Martin Short. Scharpling later purchased the suit worn by Short in Clifford via an eBay auction.

In his late teens, Scharpling had a mental breakdown that led him to be checked in to a mental hospital; his condition was cured with electroconvulsive therapy, which led to some memory loss.

Scharpling became an avid cassette tape collector, and began to use the name "Mel Sharples" (the name of a character on the sitcom Alice) for himself when ordering tapes, to distinguish himself from his father, who had the same name (Scharpling was then still known as Tom Giuliano). He found that he enjoyed having a pseudonym, because the new name had no "baggage", including no association to his previous mental illness. He decided to "tweak" the name Mel Sharples and went with "Tom Scharpling"; the surname was based on a combination of the surnames of two of his heroes at the time, activist Al Sharpton and comedian Garry Shandling, with a "c" added in for "panache".

Career

Early music-based radio shows and writing
Scharpling began volunteering at the New Jersey-based freeform station WFMU in the early 1990s. He started hosting a music-oriented program on the station in the mid-1990s. He briefly left the station in the late 1990s because he "had some personal things to take care of with family and stuff." Scharpling has told interviewers that he prefers the medium of radio due to the anxiety he gets from being onstage.

In the early 1990s, Scharpling was the publisher of 18 Wheeler fanzine, and ran an independent record label of the same name. The first 7-inch single by Portastatic was released by Scharpling's label in 1992. He also contributed the liner notes for The Electrifying Conclusion, Guided By Voices's DVD documentary of their "final" live show in Chicago.

The Best Show on WFMU

Scharpling hosted the first episode of The Best Show on WFMU on October 10, 2000. The program was a three-hour comedy, music, call-in and talk radio program that aired Tuesday nights; the program featured a roster of callers (some genuine, some acting in character), along with the occasional celebrity guest. Scharpling made no money from the station, and regularly encouraged fans to donate to the non-profit station by offering elaborate pledge drive gifts.

Nearly every episode of The Best Show featured an on-air collaboration with Superchunk drummer Jon Wurster. The pair met at a concert in the early 1990s, and bonded over their mutual love of Chris Elliott's short-lived sitcom Get a Life. As Scharpling and Wurster, they have released six albums of comedy segments from The Best Show on their Stereolaffs record label. The duo rarely performs live, with one of the few exceptions to the rule being when they hosted Matador Records' 21st Anniversary Festival at the Palms Casino in Las Vegas in October 2010.

Citing his tenure on The Best Show as proof, the August 2010 issue of GQ magazine listed Scharpling No. 11 on its list of 37 "Never Not Funny" comedians, dubbing him one of "the funniest men you haven't heard of yet."

On October 29, 2013, Scharpling announced that the final Best Show on WFMU was to air on December 17, 2013.

On October 10, 2014, 14 years to the day after The Best Show first aired, Scharpling announced via his Twitter page that The Best Show would return in November 2014. On December 17, 2014, the first episode of The Best Show in its new format, a web-cast and podcast, aired via thebestshow.net. The live webcast of the show follows the same format as it did on WFMU, with callers, skits performed by Scharpling and Wurster, and a three-hour run-time.

Scharpling is considered by some as the "Godfather Of Podcasting". Episodes of The Best Show were archived from the shows beginning, as were most of the programs on WFMU, in the RealPlayer format. It began podcasting in early 2006 with the music removed from the latest shows and offered as downloadable files on the internet through the rest of its run on the station, helping it reach an even wider audience than it had already developed.

Television
Tom Scharpling was the first writer to be hired for the series Monk. He was hired to the show by Saturday Night Live writer and fellow WFMU DJ Andy Breckman. Scharpling acted as Monk's executive producer during the last four of the show's eight seasons.

He appeared on an episode of Aqua Teen Hunger Force ("The Shaving") as the voice of "Willie Nelson", an awkward, unassertive onion–spider monster hybrid who lives in the attic of the house. He also appears on the special features portion of the Aqua Teen Hunger Force Volume 3 DVD. In addition, Scharpling occasionally wrote for Tom Goes to the Mayor and Tim and Eric Awesome Show, Great Job!. He voices Greg Universe in the animated series Steven Universe. He also voiced Jermaine in the animated series Adventure Time. Scharpling was a head writer/co-executive producer for season one of HBO's show Divorce.

Music videos
Starting in August 2010, Scharpling has directed a number of music videos, typically for groups that he is friends with, and mostly on an extremely limited budget. The shorts usually contain a number of celebrity cameos, and are often met with positive reviews.<ref name="pitch">Pitchfork Magazine article: "Video: Ted Leo: "Bottled in Cork"."</ref>

Scharpling's music video for Ted Leo and the Pharmacists's "Bottled in Cork" shows the band agreeing to star in a Broadway musical, in a spoof of Green Day's musical American Idiot. The video features Paul F. Tompkins as a theater promoter, Julie Klausner as a dance instructor and John Hodgman as a theatre critic. The video obtained "Immortal" status on Funny or Die shortly after it was released online.

With the video for The New Pornographers' "Moves", Scharpling was presented with the issue of the band being on tour, rendering them unable to appear in the short. As a solution, Scharpling chose to create a trailer for a fake biographical film about The New Pornographers, with a number of comedy celebrities portraying the various members of the band. The video features Wyatt Cenac, Horatio Sanz, Gary Dell'Abate, Todd Barry, Julie Klausner, John Hodgman, Bill Hader, Paul Rudd, Donald Glover, John Oliver, and Jon Wurster.

In 2012, Scharpling directed the video for Aimee Mann's song "Labrador", which is a shot-by-shot remake of the video for the 1985 'Til Tuesday song "Voices Carry", with Mann in the lead role, Jon Wurster playing the abusive yuppie boyfriend, and Ted Leo as the guitarist in Mann's band. The video begins with a brief "making of" clip featuring Jon Hamm as "Tom Scharpling", discussing the video concept, and Mann stating that she was tricked into doing the video.

Scharpling has also directed music videos for Titus Andronicus, Wild Flag, The Ettes, Real Estate and The Stepkids.

Web
Scharpling directed and co-wrote the web "trailer" for John Hodgman's 2011 book, That Is All.

Scharpling wrote and directed the web "trailer" aired on Funny or Die for The Postal Service band's 10-year anniversary reissue of their album Give Up.

Scharpling guest starred as the bailiff in the episode "A Room With a Feud" of John Hodgman's comedy/court show podcast Judge John Hodgman.

Scharpling has appeared as a guest multiple times on The George Lucas Talk Show, and is a frequent contributor to the live chatroom conversation.

Print
Scharpling is a regular columnist for and co-founder of the sports website The Classical. He has worked as a headline contributor for The Onion, as well as the writer of Harp Magazines "(Not So) Great Moments in Rock" column. He has also contributed basketball-themed writing to GQ and SLAM Magazine. In 2011, Scharpling was commissioned by New York Magazine to write multi-page recaps for every episode of the fourth season of NBC's Celebrity Apprentice.

On July 6, 2021, Abrams Press released Scharpling's memoir, It Never Ends: A Memoir with Nice Memories!Personal life
Until mid-2020 Scharpling lived in Woodbridge Township, New Jersey with his wife, fellow WFMU DJ Terre T.Dewan, Shaila K. "Boldface Names", The New York Times, December 27, 2001. Accessed February 27, 2020. "Terre T and her husband, Tom Scharpling, both hosts of programs on WFMU, listened to comics tell of encounters with Jim Belushi." As of January 2021, he lives in Los Angeles with his current girlfriend Julia Vickerman. He has been a pescatarian since approximately 1994, and almost never consumes alcohol.

Filmography
 As actor 

 As writer 

DiscographyRock, Rot and Rule (Stereolaffs, 1999, re-issue in 2004; Light in the Attic, 2014 [vinyl release])Chain Fights, Beer Busts and Service with a Grin (Stereolaffs, 2002)New Hope for the Ape-Eared (Stereolaffs, 2004)Hippy Justice (Stereolaffs, 2005)The Art of the Slap (Stereolaffs, 2007)A Vampire or a Dogman (Merge, 2009; from SCORE! Twenty Years Of Merge Records)The Best of The Best Show (Numero Group, 2015; retrospective box set)

WFMU Marathon PremiumsThe Best of the Best of The Best Show on WFMU Vol. 1 (2003)The Best of the Best of The Best Show on WFMU Vol. 2 (2005)The Best You Can Do Is Be Worse Than The Best Show on WFMU (2007)At The Speed Of Sound (2009)TOM – A Best Show On WFMU Tribute to Ram (2009)Best Show Uncovered Vol. 1 (2010, from the WFMU 24-Hour Emergency Marathon) (MP3 CD)

DVDFantasia in Best Show Minor: The Best Show on WFMU 2010 Marathon DVD (2011)John Hodgman: Ragnarok'' (2013)

References

External links
 
 
 
 Scharpling & Wurster website
 Stereolaffs website
 Audio archives of The Best Show on WFMU

1969 births
21st-century American comedians
American male screenwriters
American radio producers
American talk radio hosts
American television writers
Living people
American male television writers
People from Dunellen, New Jersey
People from Middlesex, New Jersey
People from Woodbridge Township, New Jersey
The College of New Jersey alumni
American radio DJs
Middlesex County College alumni
Screenwriters from New Jersey
Merge Records artists
21st-century American screenwriters
21st-century American male writers
Television producers from New Jersey